The Progressive Alliance is an international coalition of social-democratic political parties founded in 2013.

Progressive alliance may also refer to:

 Progressive Alliance (Uruguay)
 Progressive Alliance of Liberia
 Progressive alliance (UK)
 Progressive Democratic Alliance, in British Columbia
 Progressive National Alliance, in Israel
 Progressive Peoples Alliance, in Nigeria

See also
 Alliance of Progressives
 Progressive Alliance of Socialists and Democrats
 Progressive (disambiguation)
 Progressive Party (disambiguation)